Coccothrinax barbadensis (latanier, latanier balai) is a palm found in the Lesser Antilles (and Trinidad and Tobago).  Like other members of the genus Coccothrinax, C. barbadensis is a fan palm.  The leaves are widely used to thatch roofs.

The species is found in Antigua, Barbados, Barbuda, Dominica, Guadeloupe, Marie Galante, Martinique, Saint Lucia and Trinidad and Tobago.  Henderson and coauthors report that the species was probably present throughout the Lesser Antilles, but was extirpated on many of them.

George Proctor (in Acevedo-Rodríguez & Strong, 2005  ) considers Coccothrinax alta to be a distinct species (based on its shorter, more slender trunk, fewer stamens and much smaller fruit, but Rafaël Govaerts considers it a synonym of C. barbadensis.

References

barbadensis
Trees of Puerto Rico
Trees of Trinidad and Tobago
Plants described in 1853
Taxa named by Odoardo Beccari